Jeannette Wood (February 19, 1932 – January 9, 2021) was an American politician who served in the Washington House of Representatives from the 21st district from 1988 to 1994 and in the Washington State Senate from the 21st district from 1994 to 1999. Wood graduated from Cornell University. She served on the Woodway, Washington city council and as mayor of Woodway.

She died of dementia on January 9, 2021, at age 88, in Woodway, Washington.

References

1932 births
2021 deaths
Politicians from Auburn, New York
People from Snohomish County, Washington
Cornell University alumni
Women city councillors in Washington (state)
Women mayors of places in Washington (state)
Women state legislators in Washington (state)
Republican Party members of the Washington House of Representatives
Republican Party Washington (state) state senators
21st-century American women